Wild Search (伴我闖天涯) is a 1989 Hong Kong action film directed by Ringo Lam and starring Chow Yun-fat and Cherie Chung. The film is a pseudo-remake of the 1985 film Witness and deals with Hong Kong cops and Mainland criminals.

Cast and roles

 Chow Yun-fat as Lau Chung-pong/'Mew-Mew'
 Cherie Chung as Cher
 Roy Cheung as Bullet
 Paul Chun as Mr. Hung
 Chan Cheuk-yan as Ka-ka
 Ku Feng as Lee
 Tommy Wong as Nam
 Lau Kong as Leong
 Frankie Ng as Cheong
 Elaine Jin as Elaine Lee
 Wan Yeung-ming as Cop

External links 
 
 
 

1989 films
Hong Kong action thriller films
1989 action thriller films
Police detective films
1980s Cantonese-language films
Films directed by Ringo Lam
Films set in Hong Kong
Films shot in Hong Kong
1980s Hong Kong films